Lappland can refer to:

Places
 Lapland, a geographic region in Northern Fennoscandia
 Lapland (Sweden)
 Lapland (Finland)
 Lappmarken, a Swedish name for the region, not restricted to the area specifically inhabited by the Sami people
 Lappland (nature reserve) in Västmanland County, Sweden

Other uses
 Lappland, a character in the video game Arknights
 , a Swedish naval ship name

See also

 
 Lapland (disambiguation)
 Lapp (disambiguation)
 Land (disambiguation)